Strongylocentrotus intermedius is a species of sea urchin described by Alexander Agassiz in 1864.

References

Animals described in 1864
Taxa named by Alexander Agassiz
Strongylocentrotus